The Gran Ega (alternative Ladin name: Ghaidra;) is the main river of the Val Badia in South Tyrol, Italy. Its name literally translates to great water.

References 
 Information about the Gran Ega in German and Italian.

Rivers of Italy
Rivers of South Tyrol